Antonio Puppio (born 18 April 1999) is an Italian cyclist, who currently rides for UCI ProTeam .

Major results
2017
 1st  Time trial, National Junior Road Championships
 2nd  Time trial, UCI Junior Road World Championships
 10th Time trial, European Junior Road Championships
2019
 3rd Time trial, National Under-23 Road Championships
 8th Trofej Umag
 10th Time trial, European Under-23 Road Championships
2021
 2nd Ruota d'Oro
 3rd Overall Giro della Regione Friuli Venezia Giulia
1st Points classification
 3rd Trofeo Piva
 5th Time trial, National Under-23 Road Championships
 6th Coppa Bernocchi
 9th Il Piccolo Lombardia

References

External links

1999 births
Living people
Italian male cyclists
Cyclists from the Province of Varese